Jorge Iván Ulloa Aguillón (born 15 September 1958) is a Chilean politician who currently serves as amabassador of Paraguay.

He was close to Manuel Contreras.

On January 8, 1993, while a deputy, he held a six hour long filibuster in the Chamber of Deputies to allow Pablo Longueira arrive from Concepción and vote on an accusation against various ministers of the Supreme Court and the General Comptroller of the Chilean Army.

References

External links
 

1958 births
Living people
Independent Democratic Union politicians
20th-century Chilean politicians
21st-century Chilean politicians
Chilean anti-communists
University of Concepción alumni
University of Valparaíso alumni
Members of the Chamber of Deputies of Chile
Intendants of Biobío Region
Ambassadors of Chile to Paraguay
People from Talcahuano